Alexandros Axiotis (born 11 March 1996) is a Zambian swimmer. He competed in the men's 100 metre breaststroke event at the 2018 FINA World Swimming Championships (25 m), in Hangzhou, China.

References

External links
 

1996 births
Living people
Zambian male breaststroke swimmers
Place of birth missing (living people)